The Des Moines Rapids between Nauvoo, Illinois and Keokuk, Iowa-Hamilton, Illinois is one of two major rapids on the Mississippi River that limited Steamboat traffic on the river through the early 19th century.

The rapids just above the confluence of the Des Moines River were to contribute to the Honey War in the 1830s between Missouri and Iowa over the Sullivan Line that separates the two states.

Various attempts to make the river navigable started in 1837 when a channel was blasted through the rapids by U.S. Army Corps of Engineers team led by Robert E. Lee.  A canal around the rapids was built in 1877.  It is now obliterated by Lock and Dam No. 19.

The other major rapids barring traffic on the Mississippi is the Rock Island Rapids.

Beginning in 1804 United States government-sponsored trading posts for Native Americans as part of the Native American factory system began being built at the rapids.  Forts were associated with the trading posts including Fort Johnson, Fort Madison.  The forts were burned during the War of 1812.  After the war Fort [Edwards] was established and commanded by Zachary Taylor.

The distance matched the rapids but when Missouri entered the Union in 1820 its constitution instead referred to the Sullivan line as "the parallel of latitude which passes through the rapids of the River Des Moines."

Missouri did not attempt to clarify the mistake even when the Iowa (tribe), Sauk and Fox (tribe) ceded all land "in Missouri" along the line from the Mississippi to the Indian Territory Line (Sullivan's line going north from the Kansas) in 1824. This created the Half-Breed Tract.

When interest in the rapids increased in the late 1830s as work began on making the rapids navigable, along with Iowa's beginning the process of entering as a state, Missouri took an interest in asserting control of the west side of the rapids. This prompted the bloodless Honey War, with Iowa resisting the effort.

The Supreme Court was to ultimately decide in State of Missouri v.

References
Exploration and Settlement - Beautifulnavoo.com
Proceedings of the River Improvement Convention, Held in St. Louis February 12 & 13, 1867 - Union Merchants Exchange of St. Louis - 1867

Landforms of Hancock County, Illinois
Bodies of water of Illinois
Bodies of water of Iowa
Landforms of Lee County, Iowa
Mississippi River
Rapids of the United States